Imamat Day, also known as Khushali, is celebrated by Nizari Ismaili Shiʿi Muslims to mark the anniversary of the day that their present (Hazar) Imam Aga Khan IV succeeded his predecessor to become the Imam of the Time.

The Aga Khan IV is the 49th Imam of the Ismailis, having succeeded his grandfather, the Aga Khan III on July 11, 1957. His Imamat Day is therefore observed annually on July 11.

The recognition of the Imam of the Time is central to Ismailis' faith and belief. Imamat Day provides occasion to reinforce this and to express gratitude to the Imam who, in keeping with the centuries-old tradition of leadership, provides guidance in matters of faith, and works to improve the quality and security of their lives. It is a day to reaffirm their spiritual allegiance to the Imam and renew their commitment to the ethics of their faith.

References

Islamic festivals
July observances
Islamic terminology